Cyril Chapuis (born 21 March 1979) is a French former professional footballer who played as a striker.

Club career
Chapuis started his professional career at Niort in Ligue 2 and then moved to Ligue 1 for Rennes.

In January 2002, he signed a five-year contract with Olympique de Marseille, playing one and a half season with Marseille before being loaned on three occasions to Leeds United (playing just once in the league, against Bolton in November 2003), Strasbourg and Ajaccio. He was released in summer 2005.

After being without a club for one year, he joined Grenoble in Ligue 2.

In November 2012, after three years without playing a single game, Chapuis joined National team Bourg-Péronnas.

International career
He was called up to the French Under 21s and was part of the squad of Les Bleuets that lost to Czech U-21 in the final of the 2002 UEFA European Under-21 Football Championship.

References

External links

1979 births
Living people
Footballers from Lyon
Association football forwards
French footballers
France under-21 international footballers
Chamois Niortais F.C. players
Stade Rennais F.C. players
Olympique de Marseille players
Leeds United F.C. players
RC Strasbourg Alsace players
AC Ajaccio players
Grenoble Foot 38 players
FC Metz players
Football Bourg-en-Bresse Péronnas 01 players
Ligue 2 players
Ligue 1 players
Premier League players
Championnat National players
Expatriate footballers in England
French expatriate footballers